"My Number" is a song by British rock band Foals, released as the second single from their third studio album Holy Fire. The song debuted live on 13 November 2012 during the band's performance on Later... with Jools Holland. A month later to the date, they debuted the album version on Zane Lowe's BBC Radio 1 show on 13 December, then posted it via their YouTube page later the same day. A few days later, the single was released digitally in Australia on 17 December 2012. The music video premiered on 23 January 2013.

The song reached number 23 in the UK Singles Chart to become their highest charting single to date. It is also the band's most successful single to date worldwide.

The single artwork is by Leif Podhajsky.

Track listing

Charts

Certifications

Appearances in media
The song is used in ITV's UEFA Champions League: Extra Time programme when displaying group standings. The song was used prominently by the BBC during their coverage of the 2013 Six Nations rugby tournament. It also featured as the theme music for the BBC's coverage of the Glastonbury Festival 2013. The song also featured in series 2 episode 2 of BBC One drama Doctor Foster in September 2017. It also featured in EA Sports game, FIFA 14, in the form of an exclusive mix dubbed "Trophy Wife remix". It was also featured on Grey’s Anatomy in 2013 during Season 9. The track was heavily featured in an episode of the second series of Doctor Foster.

References

2012 singles
Foals songs
2012 songs
Transgressive Records singles
Funk rock songs
Songs written by Yannis Philippakis